Tarbuttite is a rare phosphate mineral with formula Zn2(PO4)(OH). It was discovered in 1907 in what is now Zambia and named for Percy Coventry Tarbutt.

Description and habit
Tarbuttite is white, yellow, red, green, brown, or colorless; in transmitted light it is colorless. Traces of copper cause green coloring, while iron hydroxides cause the other colors. Colorless crystals tend to be transparent while colored specimens have varying degrees of transparency.

Individual crystals are commonly rounded and striated.

Structure
Zinc ions are surrounded by oxygen in a nearly perfect trigonal bipyramid and phosphate groups are tetrahedral. The crystal structure consists of zig-zag chains of Zn1 polyhedra linked by phosphate groups and pairs of Zn2 polyhedra. In each unit cell are two formula units of Zn2(PO4)(OH).

History
Tarbuttite was discovered in 1907 in Broken Hill, Northern Rhodesia, (now Kabwe, Zambia). The mineral was described from specimens in cellular limonite in the largest hill of the group, Kopje No. 2. Several specimens of the mineral were collected by Percy Coventry Tarbutt, a director of the Broken Hill Exploration Company. In 1907, the name tarbuttite was proposed by L.J. Spencer in the journal Nature in honor of Tarbutt.

When the International Mineralogical Association was founded, tarbuttite was grandfathered as a valid mineral species.

Occurrence
Tarbuttite has been found in Algeria, Angola, Australia, Canada, China, Namibia, the United States, and Zambia.

Tarbuttite forms as secondary mineral in oxidized zinc deposits. It has been found in association with cerussite, descloizite, hemimorphite, hopeite, hydrozincite, "limonite", parahopeite, pyromorphite, scholzite, smithsonite, and vanadinite.

See also
List of minerals named after people

References

Bibliography

Palache, P.; Berman H.; Frondel, C. (1960). "Dana's System of Mineralogy, Volume II: Halides, Nitrates, Borates, Carbonates, Sulfates, Phosphates, Arsenates, Tungstates, Molybdates, Etc. (Seventh Edition)" John Wiley and Sons, Inc., New York, pp. 869–871.

Further reading

External links

Triclinic minerals
Zinc minerals
Phosphate minerals
Hydroxide minerals
Minerals in space group 2
Minerals described in 1907